Muntzing is the practice and technique of reducing the components inside an electronic appliance to the minimum required for it to function. The term is named after the man who invented it, Earl "Madman" Muntz, a car and electronics salesman who was also a self-taught electrical engineer.

In the 1940s and 1950s, television receivers were very complex pieces of equipment, often containing upwards of 30 vacuum tubes, as well as transformers, rheostats, and other heavy electronics. The consequent high price limited their potential for high-volume sales. Muntz determined, through trial and error, that he could remove a significant number of parts and still end up with a monochrome TV that worked very well in urban areas, close to transmission towers. He carried a pair of wire clippers around and when he felt that one of his builders was overengineering a circuit, he would begin snipping components out. When the TV stopped functioning, he would reinsert the last part and leave the TV as it was.

As a result of removing tubes and greatly simplifying circuits originally designed to boost function in fringe areas (far from transmission towers), Muntz's sets generated less heat, thus diminishing overheating which was one of the most common reasons for failure in early sets. The reduced circuitry also reduced the power requirements; as a result, smaller power supplies could be used, so the sets weighed significantly less. Additionally, as the power supplies contained expensive copper, this further reduced cost.

See also 
Cost engineering
Electronic engineering
Just-in-Time Manufacturing
KISS principle
Minimalism (computing)
Design for lean manufacturing
Muda (Japanese term)
Value engineering

References 

Electronics optimization